Breaking the Silence is the debut album by American thrash metal band Heathen, released in 1987 by Combat Records. As of 1987, the album sold about 100,000 copies worldwide.

Track listing

Personnel 
Dave White – lead vocals
Lee Altus – guitars
Doug Piercy – guitars
Mike Jazstremski – bass
Carl Sacco – drums

Production 
Eddy Schreyer – mastering
Mark Weinberg – art direction
Kent Mathieu – cover art
Ronnie Montrose – producer
Roger Wiersma – engineering
Dave Porter – recording
Keith Hatschek – recording
Joel Jaffe – recording (drums)
Dan Godfrey – recording (drums)
Alvin Petty – logo

References

External links 
[ AllMusic listing]

Heathen (band) albums
1987 debut albums
Combat Records albums